Visa requirements for Pakistani citizens are administrative entry restrictions imposed on citizens of Pakistan by the authorities of other states. As of November 2022, Pakistani citizens had visa-free, visa on arrival, or e-visa access to 32 countries and territories ranking the Pakistani passport 109th in terms of travel freedom according to the Henley Passport Index.

Visa requirements map

Visa requirements

Non-Visa restrictions

See also

 Visa policy of Pakistan
 Pakistani passport
 List of nationalities forbidden at border

References and Notes
References

Notes

Pakistan
Foreign relations of Pakistan